The 2010 World Cup Taekwondo Team Championships is the 3rd edition of the World Cup Taekwondo Team Championships, and was held at Xinjiang Sports Center in Urumqi, China from July 17 to July 20, 2010.

The participating male and female teams are divided into five groups each and the top four countries at the previous championship and the host country are seeded. Top five teams and three best-record teams among the second-placed teams in the men's and women's division of the preliminary round advance to the quarterfinal round. The quarterfinal, semifinal and final matches are conducted in a single elimination format.

Medalists

Men

Preliminary round

Group A

Group B

Group C

Group D

Group E

Knockout round

Women

Preliminary round

Group A

Group B

Group C

Group D

Group E

Knockout round

References

World Cup
Taekwondo World Cup
World Cup Taekwondo Team Championships
Taekwondo Championships